is a railway station in Chūō, Tokyo, Japan, operated by East Japan Railway Company (JR East).

Lines

Shin-Nihombashi Station is served by the Sōbu Line (Rapid). Passengers can transfer to the nearby Mitsukoshimae Station on the Tokyo Metro Ginza Line and the Tokyo Metro Hanzōmon Line.

Station layout
The underground station has one island platform serving two tracks.

Platforms

History
The station opened on July 15, 1972.

Surrounding area
 Mitsukoshimae Station ( Ginza Line and  Hanzomon Line)

References

External links

Station information by JR East 

Railway stations in Japan opened in 1972
Railway stations in Tokyo
Nihonbashi, Tokyo